Herent is a municipality located in the Belgian province of Flemish Brabant. The municipality comprises the villages and former municipalities of Herent proper, Veltem-Beisem and Winksele. On January 1, 2016, Herent had a total population of 21,213. The total area is 32.73 km² resulting in a population density of 648 inhabitants per km². The current mayor (as of 2018) is Astrid Pollers.

Schools 
Catholic schools: De Kraal & Pastoor De Clerckschool
Official Schools: De Bijenkorf (Flemish Community) & Toverveld (municipal)

Image gallery

References

External links
 
Official website - Available only in Dutch

Municipalities of Flemish Brabant